Barbora Krejčíková defeated Anett Kontaveit in the final, 6–2, 6–3 to win the singles tennis title at the 2022 Tallinn Open. 

This was the first edition of the event.

Seeds

Draw

Finals

Top half

Bottom half

Qualifying

Seeds

Qualifiers

Lucky loser

Qualifying draw

First qualifier

Second qualifier

Third qualifier

Fourth qualifier

Fifth qualifier

Sixth qualifier

References

External links 
Qualifying draw
Main draw

Tallinn Open